Harrison Garside (born 22 July 1997) is an Australian boxer. He competed in the men's lightweight event at the 2020 Summer Olympics where he won the bronze medal. This marked the first time in more than three decades that an Australian medaled in boxing at the Olympics.

In 2015, Garside won his first of six Australian National Championships. In 2018 he competed at the Gold Coast Commonwealth Games where he won the gold medal in the men's 60kg division.

, Garside had won seven Australian national boxing championships.

Professional boxing record

Personal life
Garside decided he wanted to take up boxing when he was 9 years old. This came as a shock to his family as he was not considered to be a boxer. He was the youngest of three boys and was closest to his mum. He was inspired by the Olympic Spirit from a young age, having photos of Cathy Freeman and Ian Thorpe on his bedroom ceiling to inspire him.

Garside joined the Lilydale Youth Club which became his second home. He was at first to be an easy target and lost 10 of his first 18 fights. Garside harnessed an underdog mentality and he was motivated to train harder.

Garside is employed as a plumber. He wore nail polish during the 2020 Olympics, citing his desire to defy gender stereotypes.

References

External links
 
 

1997 births
Living people
Australian male boxers
Olympic boxers of Australia
Boxers at the 2020 Summer Olympics
Place of birth missing (living people)
Medalists at the 2020 Summer Olympics
Olympic medalists in boxing
Olympic bronze medalists for Australia
Australian plumbers
Commonwealth Games medallists in boxing
Boxers at the 2018 Commonwealth Games
Boxers from Melbourne
Sportsmen from Victoria (Australia)
People from Ferntree Gully, Victoria
Commonwealth Games gold medallists for Australia
Medallists at the 2018 Commonwealth Games